Regauging may refer to
 track gauge conversion in railways
 something to do with gauge theory
 something to do with the Simple Magnetic Overunity Toy